The Physical Education building is the University of Southern California's oldest on-campus athletic building. It is home to the 1,000-seat North Gym as well as the campus's first indoor swimming facilities.

The North Gym was the USC Trojans men's volleyball and USC Trojans women's volleyball teams' home court from 1970 until 1988. From 1989 to 2006, the North Gym and the Lyon Center split time as the teams' home courts. In 2007, the teams moved to the Galen Center, but use the old venues if the Galen Center is reserved for other events.

Until 2006, the Trojans basketball and volleyball teams held practice in the North Gym.

The Physical Education building is home to USC's Air Force, Army, and Navy ROTC programs, and has been used as a filming location for many films, including Love & Basketball and Swimfan.

References

Basketball venues in Los Angeles
College basketball venues in the United States
College swimming venues in the United States
College volleyball venues in the United States
Swimming venues in Los Angeles
Physical Education Building
Physical Education Building
Physical Education Building
Physical Education Building
Volleyball venues in Los Angeles